Jarvis Borum (born September 16, 1978) is a former American football offensive guard and tackle who played one season for the Arizona Cardinals of the National Football League (NFL).

Early life and education
Borum was born on September 16, 1978. He attended high school at W. J. Keenan (SC) and college at NC State.

Professional career

Arizona Cardinals

Borum was signed as an undrafted free-agent on April 23, 2001.  Ironically, he was listed as a guard and never played a snap of guard in high school or college. He was released on November 6. He was then signed to the practice squad the next day. In 2001 he played 1 game. In 2002 he did not make the Cardinals roster, due to burnout from forced allocation to the NFL EUROPE.

Scottish Claymores

Borum played for the Scottish Claymores in 2002 and was named 2002 Official All-NFLE.

Cleveland Browns

In September of  2002 he was signed to the practice squad of the Cleveland Browns. He was released two weeks later.

Miami Dolphins

He was signed by the Miami Dolphins but did not make the roster due to injury. In his career he played one game.

References

Living people
1978 births
American football offensive tackles
American football offensive guards
NC State Wolfpack football players
Arizona Cardinals players
Scottish Claymores players
Players of American football from Columbia, South Carolina